Dr Nooh Edrees al-Kaddo (born 21 January 1953) is a British citizen who resides in Dublin, Ireland and was born in Mosul, Iraq. Al-Kaddo is the CEO of the Islamic Cultural Centre of Ireland and a director of the al-Maktoum Foundation in Ireland and moved to Dublin in 1997.

Al-Kaddo is also a trustee or member of the board of multiple charities and religious institutions in different European countries including the Human Relief Foundation and is secretary of the Essalam Islamic Cultural Centre in Rotterdam, the Netherlands.

In March 2015 a dispute broke out in the Essalam Islamic Cultural Centre (EICC) in Rotterdam between the local Moroccan Muslim community and the board of the EICC. The local Moroccan community expected the EICC to be their local community mosque but saw that the mosque was transformed into an Islamic Cultural Centre with multiple functions far exceeding the expectation of the local Moroccan community. Nooh al-Kaddo was the boardmember whom was put on the spot by the opposition. Al-Kaddo had to explain himself in the press why a Dutch convert, Jacob van der Blom, was made deputy-director at the EICC and was in charge of daily operations. Also the grievances of the local Muslims were aimed at the increased number of activities in the EICC focused on Muslim converts.

References

1953 births
Living people
Irish chief executives
Irish Muslims
Irish people of Iraqi descent